Manipur University of Culture is a State Public University established and recognised by the State Government of Manipur.

History

It was established through an Act of the Manipur State Legislature, The Manipur University of Culture Act, 2015. Its main purpose is to serve the people of Manipur in terms of cultural studies and also to promote the rich cultural heritage of the State. Currently it operates from its temporary campus in Palace Compound, Imphal. Classes for the first batch of students has started from Fall 2016.

The University is recognized by the State Government of Manipur and UGC, Government of India.

References

Universities in Manipur
Education in Imphal
2015 establishments in Manipur
Educational institutions established in 2015
State universities in India